The fourth generation Ford Focus, also known as the Focus Mk IV (codename: C519), is a compact car (C-segment) which was produced by Ford from 2018. It was revealed in April 2018 to replace the third-generation Focus. As in the previous generation, the model is available with saloon, hatchback and estate body styles. This generation marked the demise of the Focus line-up in many regions, including North America, South America, and Southeast Asia, effectively limiting its market reach to just Europe, China, Taiwan, Australasia, and other minor markets.

Overview 
On 10 April 2018, Ford unveiled the European- and Asian-market versions of the fourth-generation Focus, to mark the nameplate's 20th anniversary. It is underpinned by the Ford C2 platform, an evolution of the C1 platform used on previous iterations of the car and 20 percent stiffer in torsional rigidity. The Mk4 Focus also features a weight reduction of up to  compared with the Mk3.

At launch, six trim levels were available for the car, which consists of the Active, Ambiente, ST-Line, Titanium, Trend and Vignale. The Vignale trim is given satin aluminum finishes for the roof rails, fascia and rocker inserts, as well as a signature grille mesh. Only the ST-Line and Titanium trims were introduced in China.

Newly introduced interior features include an electric parking brake, and a shift-by-wire rotary dial gearshift. An eight-inch touchscreen SYNC 3 infotainment system was also introduced, as well as a wireless charging pad. Other available kit includes a 675 watt, 10-speaker B&O Play audio system and FordPass Connect embedded modem system, which also offers access to vehicle locator and remote start via the FordPass mobile app.

For interior space, shoulder-room for rear passengers has been increased by nearly 61 mm and knee clearance and legroom has been improved by 51 mm and 71 mm respectively.

Body styles

Models

ST-Line 
The ST-Line trim level is an aggressively-styled version of the Focus. It includes addition of a dark-finished 17-inch wheels, sports body kit, large diffuser, functional roof spoiler, lower wing elements, and polished twin tailpipes. It is also equipped with sports-tuned suspension which is tuned to reach a balance between dynamic handling and comfort.

Vignale 
The Vignale trim level is a luxury-oriented version of the Focus. It offers extra equipments and styling changes. It includes satin aluminium elements as well as a signature Vignale mesh grille. Other features include larger 18-inch wheels, LED headlights, heads-up display for the navigation and other functions plus Active Park Assist. There is also a contrasting stitching on the dashboard, full leather trim with Vignale badging, a B&O sound system, and multi-colour ambient lighting.

Active 
The Active trim level is a crossover-styled version of the Focus. To give a rugged styling to the car, it features bespoke front end design, off-road styled accessories such as black protective wheel arches and rocker claddings and front/rear skid plates. This model is available in hatchback and station wagon body styles.

In China, the estate model was released in November 2020 with a reworked front fascia and marketed as the Focus Shooting Brake.

Focus ST 

In February 2019, Ford announced the fourth-generation Focus ST for the European market. It was launched in mid-2019.

The Focus ST is offered with a choice of either a 2.3-litre EcoBoost turbocharged petrol engine with a  power output or a 2.0-litre EcoBlue diesel engine with a 190 PS power output. As standard, all models come with a six-speed manual transmission however a new performance-optimized seven-speed automatic transmission (which includes wheel-mounted paddle-shifters, based on Ford 8F40 transmission without 2nd gear) is also available as an option in the near future.

On the exterior, the Focus ST features a revised grille, unique 18- or 19-inch alloy wheels, larger rear spoiler and twin-exit tailpipes. Interior changes include Recaro front seats, aluminium gear knob, pedals and scuff plates, and decorative elements with grey stitching.

The EcoBoost variant of the new Focus ST is the first front-wheel-drive Ford model to feature an electronic limited-slip differential (eLSD). An anti-lag system is also implemented to aid with power delivery.

Like the Fiesta ST, an optional "Performance Pack" is available. The package includes launch control and rev-matching for the manual EcoBoost variant, "Track" driving mode, and red-painted brake callipers.

August 2021, Ford unveiled a new, special edition version of the Focus ST called the "Edition", limited to 300 for UK and 200 for Europe. Specification is 2.3‑litre EcoBoost petrol engine, six-speed manual with electronic limited-slip differential (eLSD) and 4 selectable Drive Modes, including Track Mode. Flow-formed alloy wheels and two way adjustable suspension by KW Automotive. Only available in Azura Blue, with Gloss Black detailing including wheels, rear diffuser, roof and spoiler.

2022 refresh 
In June 2022, the Focus received an update in Europe which includes the addition of a new electrified powertrain and some minor changes to the equipment list. With the EcoBoost Hybrid, the standard alternator is replaced with a belt-driven integrated starter-generator (BISG), enabling energy recuperation during braking and coasting to charge a 48-volt lithium-ion battery pack located beneath the front passenger seat.

Ford has also introduced a configurable 12.3-inch digital instrument cluster. The new Connected variant comes as standard with a wireless charging pad, a SYNC 3 infotainment system with navigation, adaptive cruise control, front and rear parking sensors and a rearview camera.

Meanwhile, the ST-Line and Active gain dual-zone climate control, auto-dimming rear-view mirror, rain-sensing wipers and keyless entry as standard kit. ST-Line X models come with a larger roof spoiler and the Active X gets a black headliner.

Marketing 
In April 2018, Ford announced that all passenger vehicles but the Mustang would be discontinued in the North American market, in order to focus on trucks and SUVs. The Focus Active was intended to be the only version of the model available in the market, but Ford cancelled these plans in August 2018 over tariffs imposed by the U.S. government on exports from China, as the model is manufactured in the country.

Ford also cancelled plans to manufacture the fourth generation Focus in Thailand, due to the low sales for the previous generation Focus, and a strategy change saw that Ford halting sales and production of the passenger cars in the country.

Ford limited sales of fourth generation Focus in its 4-door saloon form in Estonia, Latvia, Lithuania, Serbia, Montenegro, North Macedonia, Albania, Bulgaria, Romania, Moldova, Turkey, Cyprus as well as many Asian and African countries. Ford no longer sells the Focus in Russia, Belarus, Kazakhstan, and Israel due to a broader reorganization of their European branch.

In April 2020, Ford confirmed there are no plans for a fourth generation Focus RS model due to pan-European emissions standards and high development costs.

Australia 
The SA Ford Focus was launched in November 2018 in Australia with Trend, and ST-Line models available from launch. Ambiente, Active and Titanium models were available in mid-2019. The Focus ST launched in 2020.

It was also the first time the wagon was available in Australia and solely in ST-Line guise. The wagon was initially the only variant to offer fully independent rear suspension (IRS), whereas other variants were fitted with a torsion-beam rear suspension.

Transmissions include the 8F24 8-speed automatic standard on 1.5 L EcoBoost, 6-speed manual standard on ST, with a 7-speed automatic a no-cost option. A 6-speed automatic was previously offered on Ambiente models.

The Focus has received a full 5-star ANCAP safety rating.

In June 2020, the Focus lineup in Australia had been culled to only the ST-Line Hatch (wagon discontinued), Active and ST. To compensate for the discontinuation of the Titanium, features such as front parking sensors and LED headlights were made standard on the ST-Line. Independent rear suspension was also added to the ST-Line where it was previously only fitted on the ST-Line wagon and Active. FordPass 4G modems were also added to the Focus in Australia for the first time allowing remote unlocking and start from a smartphone.

Coinciding with the launch of the facelift model in 2022, only the ST model will be sold, with non-Ford Performance models (ST-Line Hatch and Active) being discontinued in Australia. The ST and ST X will replace the ST-1 and ST-2 variants launched in 2020. The ST now receives less standard equipment than previously, such as 18 alloys rather than the 19" alloys previously standard across the range. While the ST X gains LED matrix headlights and 19" alloys.

Ford Australia discontinued the Focus ST and Fiesta ST, from its lineup on August 5, 2022. Forty examples of the facelifted Focus ST were secured for the Australian market, with both vehicles to be retired before the end of 2022. The company said the decision was led by the semiconductor chip shortage and a priority for its higher selling vehicles, such as the Ranger, Everest, Mustang, Escape and Puma.

Powertrain

Safety 
The fourth-generation Focus features the Ford Co-Pilot360 technology which is claimed to enhance safety, driving and parking.

Another safety features include Adaptive Front Lighting System with Predictive curve light and Sign-based light, Active Park Assist 2, Park-out Assist, Pre-Collision Assist with Pedestrian and Cyclist Detection, Evasive Steering Assist, Blind Spot Information System with Cross Traffic Alert, Rear wide-view camera, Wrong Way Alert, Ford MyKey and Post-Collision Braking.

Discontinuation 
Ford's chairman Stuart Rowley has told a conference call of journalists in June 2022 that the production of the Ford Focus will end in 2025, as the brand will moving towards for a fully electric vehicle future.

References

External links 

 Official website  (United Kingdom)

ANCAP small family cars
Euro NCAP small family cars
Cars introduced in 2018
2010s cars
Goods manufactured in Germany
Ford Focus
Focus
Compact cars
Station wagons
Sedans
Hatchbacks